David Ludwig may refer to:

 David Ludwig (physician), American physician
 David Ludwig (composer) (born 1974), American composer